Acalymma gouldi is a leaf beetle species in the genus Acalymma found in North America.

References

Galerucinae
Beetles described in 1947
Taxa named by Herbert Spencer Barber
Beetles of North America